Gandrup is a small Danish town in Region Nordjylland with a population of 1,573 (1 January 2022). It is located 15 km east of the centre of Aalborg, and is a part of Aalborg Municipality. (It had been the administrative centre of the former Hals Municipality up to December 31, 2006.)

References

Cities and towns in the North Jutland Region
Towns and settlements in Aalborg Municipality